Being Human is a British supernatural drama programme created and written by Toby Whithouse for Touchpaper Television. The fifth and final series began airing on BBC Three on 3 February 2013 and continued until mid-March 2013. The series follows the lives of a new ghost, vampire and werewolf trio living together and attempting to lead a normal life, and blends a mixture of flatshare comedy and horror drama.

Main cast
 Michael Socha as Tom McNair
 Damien Molony as Hal Yorke
 Kate Bracken as Alex Millar
 Steven Robertson as Dominic Rook

Recurring cast / guest stars
 Phil Davis as Captain Hatch / The Devil
 Colin Hoult as Crumb
 Julian Barratt as Larry
 Victoria Ross as Lady Catherine
 Benjamin Greaves-Neal as Oliver 
 Madeleine Harris as Hettie
 Claire Cage as Patsy
 Non Haf as Sophie
 Toby Whithouse as Home Secretary Alistair Frith
 Kathryn Prescott as Natasha Miles

Episodes

References

External links

Being Human (TV series) episodes
2013 British television seasons